Bengt Fredrik Fries (24 August 1799, in Helsingborg – 7 April 1839, in Stockholm) was a Swedish zoologist.
He studied at Lund University.

Works
Observationes entomologicæ (1824)
Beskrifning nya insekter från Colombien (1833).
Skandinaviens fiskar: målade efter lefvande exemplar och ritade på sten. Stockholm: P. A. Norstedt & Soner (A history of Scandinavian fishes) 1836-57 with  Carl Ulric Ekström :sv:Carl Ulric Ekström and Carl Jakob Sundevall.

External links
Goran Waldeck

Swedish entomologists
Swedish zoologists
1799 births
1839 deaths